Atzo Nicolaï (22 February 1960 – 19 August 2020) was a Dutch politician of the People's Party for Freedom and Democracy (VVD) and businessman.

Education and early career  
Nicolaï attended a Montessori Gymnasium Rotterdam from April 1972 until May 1980 and applied at the Free University Amsterdam in June 1980 majoring in Law and Political science and obtaining a Bachelor of Laws degree and a Bachelor of Social Science degree in Political science in June 1982 before graduating with a Master of Laws degree and a Master of Social Science degree in Political science in July 1987. Nicolaï worked as a civil servant for the department of Arts and Culture of the Ministry of Welfare, Health and Culture from August 1987 until December 1990, and as Director-General of the Council for Arts from December 1990 until November 1995 and as Director-General of the Council for Culture from November 1995 until May 1998. Nicolaï worked as a management consultant for the Ministry of Education, Culture and Science from March 1997 until May 1998.

Political career 
Nicolaï was elected as a House of Representatives member after the election of 1998, taking office on 19 May 1998 serving as a frontbencher and the spokesperson for Justice, Law enforcement, Media, Culture and deputy spokesperson for Social Affairs and Social Work. After the election of 2002 Nicolaï was appointed as State Secretary for Foreign Affairs in the Cabinet Balkenende I, taking office on 22 July 2002. The Cabinet Balkenende I fell just four months later on 16 October 2002 after tensions in the coalition over the stability of the Pim Fortuyn List (LPF) and continued to serve in a demissionary capacity. After the election of 2003 Nicolaï returned as a Member of the House of Representatives, taking office on 30 January 2003. Following the cabinet formation of 2003 Nicolaï continued as State Secretary for Foreign Affairs in the Cabinet Balkenende II, taking office on 27 May 2003. The Cabinet Balkenende II fell on 30 June 2006 after the Democrats 66 (D66) had lost confidence in the functioning of Minister of Integration and Asylum Affairs Rita Verdonk and continued to serve in a demissionary capacity until the cabinet formation of 2006 when it was replaced by the caretaker Cabinet Balkenende III with Nicolaï appointed as Minister for Governmental Reform and Kingdom Relations, taking office on 7 July 2006. After the election of 2006 Nicolaï again returned as a Member of the House of Representatives, taking office on 30 November 2006. The Cabinet Balkenende III was replaced by the Cabinet Balkenende IV following the cabinet formation of 2007 on 22 February 2007 and he continued to serve in the House of Representatives as a frontbencher and spokesperson for Foreign Affairs, Social Affairs, European Affairs, NATO, Benelux Union, Aviation and deputy spokesperson for Kingdom Relations and Social Work. After the election of 2010 Nicolaï was appointed Minister of Foreign Affairs in the Cabinet Rutte I but during the cabinet formation of 2010 his appointment was blocked by the coalition partner Party for Freedom (PVV) and he continued to serve in the House of Representatives chairing the parliamentary committee for Foreign Affairs.

In May 2011, Nicolaï was named as Chairman of the Board of directors of the DSM Company, and he resigned as a Member of the House of Representatives the same day he was installed as Chairman on 1 June 2011. Nicolaï also became active in the public sector and occupied numerous seats as a nonprofit director on several boards of directors and supervisory boards (National History Museum, Bird Protection Foundation). Nicolaï also worked as a trade association executive for the Chemical Industry association serving as Vice Chairman of the Executive Board from 1 June 2011 until 1 October 2019 and for the Industry and Employers confederation (VNO-NCW).

Decorations

References

External links

Official
  Mr.Drs. A. (Atzo) Nicolaï Parlement & Politiek

 
 

 

 

 

1960 births
2020 deaths
Dutch academic administrators
Dutch chief executives in the manufacturing industry
Dutch corporate directors
Dutch male dramatists and playwrights
Dutch magazine editors
Dutch nonprofit directors
Dutch nonprofit executives
Dutch theatre managers and producers
Dutch trade association executives
Members of the House of Representatives (Netherlands)
Members of the Social and Economic Council
Ministers of Kingdom Relations of the Netherlands
Ministers without portfolio of the Netherlands
Officers of the Order of Orange-Nassau
People from Amstelveen
People from Delft
People's Party for Freedom and Democracy politicians
State Secretaries for Foreign Affairs of the Netherlands
Vrije Universiteit Amsterdam alumni
Academic staff of Vrije Universiteit Amsterdam
Academic staff of the University of Amsterdam
20th-century Dutch civil servants
20th-century Dutch businesspeople
20th-century Dutch jurists
20th-century Dutch male writers
20th-century Dutch politicians
21st-century Dutch civil servants
21st-century Dutch businesspeople
21st-century Dutch jurists
21st-century Dutch male writers
21st-century Dutch politicians
20th-century Dutch dramatists and playwrights
21st-century Dutch dramatists and playwrights